Chester Noyes Bulger (September 18, 1917 – February 18, 2009) was an American football player and coach. He played professionally as a tackle in the National Football League (NFL) for the Chicago Cardinals. Bulger was born in Rumford, Maine, and after graduating from Stephen's High School, he attended Auburn University on a track and field scholarship, where he then walked onto the football team.  Bulger played for the Chicago Cardinals from 1942 to 1949, where he was part of the line that helped lead the Cardinals to the NFL Championship in 1947.  After retiring from football in 1951, Bulger remained in Chicago and became a teacher, coach, and eventual athletic director at De La Salle Institute.  He remained there until 1982 and was subsequently an integral member of the school's development office into the early 1990s. In 2007, De La Salle honored Bulger's contributions to the school by renaming the main athletic field in his honor.

Bulger served as the head football coach at Saint Mary's College—now known as Saint Mary's University of Minnesota—Winona, Minnesota for one season, in 1954. Saint Mary's football program was disbanded after the season.

Bulger died of natural causes on February 18, 2009, at his home in Fairfax, Virginia. He was 91.

Head coaching record

References

External links
 
 

1917 births
2009 deaths
American football tackles
Auburn Tigers football players
Auburn Tigers men's track and field athletes
Card-Pitt players
Chicago Cardinals players
Detroit Lions players
Saint Mary's Redmen football coaches
High school football coaches in Illinois
Sportspeople from Fairfax, Virginia
People from Rumford, Maine
Coaches of American football from Maine
Players of American football from Maine
Track and field athletes from Maine